Choi Tae-joon (born July 7, 1991) is a South Korean actor, model and TV host. He first gained recognition for his villainous supporting role in the disaster-mystery drama Missing 9 (2017). He has since taken on lead roles in melodrama Exit (2018) and romcom So I Married the Anti-fan (2021).

Career
Choi made his acting debut as a child actor, playing the younger version of Jo In-sung's character in the television series Piano (2001).

Choi gained recognition with his supporting roles as the protagonist's estranged son in fantasy drama Padam Padam (2011), a 20-year-old high school bully in webtoon adaptation Adolescence Medley (2013), a villain in disaster drama Missing 9 (2017), and a lawyer in romance comedy drama Suspicious Partner (2017). Choi also starred in the youth film Eclipse (2016) as the lead.

Choi was a cast member of the virtual reality show We Got Married in 2016, pairing with Apink's Yoon Bo-mi.
Choi became a permanent host on the Korean variety show Hello Counselor in September after being a guest two weeks in a row in August 2016.

In 2018, Choi was cast in his first lead role on network television in the 2-episode drama special Exit. He was then cast in the romantic comedy series So I Married the Anti-fan as the male lead, based on the webtoon of the same name.

Personal life

Marriage
On March 7, 2018, it was confirmed by Huayi Brothers that Choi has been in a relationship with actress Park Shin-hye since late 2017.

On November 23, 2021, it was announced that Park is pregnant and both of them were preparing for marriage. They got married on January 22, 2022, in presence of friends and family in a church ceremony in Seoul. On May 31, 2022, Park gave birth to a son.

Military service
Choi started his military service along with Bang Yong-guk on August 1, 2019, and served as a public service worker due to health issues. He was discharged from his service on May 18, 2021.

Filmography

Film

Television series

Web series

Television show

Music video

Awards and nominations

References

External links
 
 
 

South Korean male film actors
South Korean male television actors
South Korean male models
Male actors from Seoul
1991 births
Living people
Chung-Ang University alumni